Defying Ocean's End (DOE) is a global agenda for action in marine conservation compiled in a 2004 Island Press book. It is also the title of a 2003 Los Cabos (Mexico) conference, where the agenda was formulated.

The DOE website describes itself as "a practical agenda of action to safeguard the ocean for future generations to come. This dynamic strategy-including costs and recommendations-is a collective voice for those seeking to reverse the disturbing trends we are witnessing in the ocean today. As never again, we have an opportunity now to respond to this crisis, by moving beyond localized and ad hoc initiatives - however good they might be - to coordinated global action."

The website also lists a "DOE Office" charged with distributing the agenda. The office is composed of Dr. Sylvia Earle, Arlo Hemphill, Tim Noviello and Linda K. Glover:.

Defying Ocean's End book
Published in 2004 by Island Press, Defying Ocean's End is now used as a university textbook for marine conservation. The book is a collaboration of over 70 authors and was edited by Linda K. Glover and Dr. Sylvia Earle, along with assistant editor Arlo Hemphill and maps created by Debra Fischman. The book also includes a foreword by Great Barrier Reef Marine Park Authority founding director Graeme Kelleher.

Photographers for the book include Paul Arena, Haroldo Castro, David Doubilet, Sylvia Earle, Peter Etnoyer, Greg Foster, Neil Hammerschlag, Arlo Hemphill, Wolcott Henry, Jennifer Jeffers, Lance Jordan, Roderic Mast, Cristina Mittermeier, Russell Mittermeier, NASA, NOAA Office of Exploration, Roger Steene, Patricio Robles Gil, Timothy Werner and Sterling Zumbrunn.

A photograph of Pearl Jam rhythm guitarist Stone Gossard is included in the book, along with a note of appreciation.

Chapters of the book are:
 1. The Caribbean
 2. Seamount Biodiversity, Exploitation and Conservation
 3. The Southern Ocean: A Model System for Conserving Resources?
 4. Coral Triangle
 5. The Gulf of California: Natural Resource Concerns and the Pursuit of a Vision
 6. Lines on the Water: Ocean-Use Planning in Large Marine Ecosystem
 7. Rationality or Chaos? Global Fisheries at the Crossroads
 8. A Global Network for Sustained Governance of Coastal Ecosystems
 9. Restoring and Maintaining Marine Ecosystem Function
 10. Defying Ocean's End through the Power of Communications
 11. Ocean Governance: A New Ethos through a World Ocean Public Trust
 12. The Unknown Ocean
 13. Business Plan
 14. Technology Support to Conservation

Los Cabos conference
Defying Ocean's End was launched at a conference held in Los Cabos, Mexico on May 29 to June 3, 2003. The conference was organized by Conservation International; convened by American oceanographer, Dr. Sylvia Earle, and Intel Corporation co-founder, Gordon Moore; and chaired by Graeme Kelleher. It included the participation of nearly 150 experts from more than 20 countries, representing the fields of ocean science, finance, and conservation. A select group of senior representatives from world governments, corporations and the media were also in attendance. In addition to Conservation International, a number of large, international conservation organizations collaborated on the conference. These included The Nature Conservancy, Natural Resources Defense Council, The Ocean Conservancy, Wildlife Conservation Society, the International Union for Conservation of Nature and the World Wildlife Fund. The Conference was sponsored by the Gordon and Betty Moore Foundation, BP, ESRI, Royal Caribbean Cruise Lines and the Alexander Henry Foundation.

The conference was structured into 5 regional case studies, 7 thematic working groups, and a business team focused on developing Action Plans which addressed specific issues and outcomes - with priorities, and costs identified—for 1-year, 3-year, and 10-year timeframes. Five case studies were presented to all Conference participants, which addressed lessons learned and recommendations in very different regions: The Caribbean, Seamounts, Antarctic Waters, The Coral Triangle and the Gulf of California.

Break-out discussions were divided into seven Thematic Working Groups on widely ranging science, conservation, social, economic and legal topics:

Ocean-Use Planning and Marine Protected Areas
Economic Incentives and Disincentives
Land-Ocean Interface
Maintaining/Restoring Functional Marine Ecosystems
Communication
Ocean Governance
The Unknown Ocean

A Business Team led by Larry Linden of Goldman Sachs worked with all groups to identify key cost drivers and estimate reasonable total solution costs.

Results
The DOE website lists the following "high level" results:

 Global Governance: Treat the 60% of the world ocean outside of national Exclusive Economic Zones as a World Ocean Public Trust. Establish legal and implementation approaches concerning ocean uses in the high seas - including fisheries - under coordinated, international multi-use zoning regimes.
 Fisheries Reform: Use market-based mechanisms and changes to subsidies to reform fisheries through development of sustainable fishing projects, and the establishment of a global fund to provide incentives for the adoption of sustainable practices.
 Communications: Implement global and regional communications plans; focus on educating the general public worldwide to ocean problems. Initiate global all-media campaigns on major issues. In developing nations, tailor the message to local cultural concerns, understanding and information networks (e.g., tribal elders), and build local capacity for disseminating the message.
 Marine Protected Areas/Large Marine Ecosystems: Create, consolidate, and strengthen marine protected areas (MPAs) into a globally representative network. Develop/implement coordinated, global large marine ecosystem (LME) programs in identified priority regions. Provide more robust multi-use zoning and enforcement mechanisms to protect these LMEs. Establish LME/MPA protections over 5% of the world ocean within the next 10 years (0.7% currently).
 Global Science: Develop an expanded applied research program focused on top priority marine environments high in endemism and biodiversity - seamounts, shallow- and deep-water reefs, continental slopes, caves and blue holes.

Participants
Notable attendees of the Defying Ocean's End conference included Chris Anderson, Dr. Farooq Azam, Jean-Michel Cousteau, Dr. Sylvia Earle, Cristina Mittermeier, Dr. Russell Mittermeier, Gordon Moore, Dr. Ransom A. Myers, Dr. Callum Roberts and David Sandalow.

Additional participating organizations included:

Agrupacion Sierra Madre, Unidos Para la Conservacion
American University
Boston University
British Antarctic Survey
Cabot-Wellington LLC
California Academy of Sciences
Charles Darwin Research Station
Chinese Academy of Fishery Sciences
CORDIO
CSIRO Marine and Atmospheric Research
Dalhousie University
David and Lucile Packard Foundation
Duke University
Environmental Defense Fund
Environmental Solutions International
Florida Institute of Oceanography
Foundation Patagonia Natural
GE Capital Mexico
George Mason University
GloverWorks Consulting
Goldman Sachs
Green Team Advertising, Inc.
Government of Baja California Sur
Hauslein & Company, Inc.
IFREMER
Instituto Nacional de Ecologia (Mexico)
Inter-American Tropical Tuna Commission
International Community Foundation
International Institute for Environmental Communication
International Seakeepers Society
IUCN Species Survival Commission
Marine Conservation Biology Institute
Massachusetts Institute of Technology
Meridian Strategy Group, LLC
Ministry of Marine Affairs and Fisheries, Indonesia
National Geographic Society
National Oceanic and Atmospheric Administration
New England Aquarium
Ocean Futures Society
Richard B. Gump South Pacific Research Station
Rowan Companies
Rutgers University
The Sapling Foundation
Scripps Institution of Oceanography
SeaWeb
Sinar Harian Daily
Texas A&M University
Universidade Federal da Bahia
University of California, Davis
University of Cape Town
University of Iceland 
University of Maryland
University of Miami
University of Minnesota
University of North Carolina
University of Otago
University of the Philippines
University of Rhode Island
University of Washington
University of York
WildAid
Woods Hole Oceanographic Institution
World Conservation Monitoring Centre
World Resources Institute

References

External links
Defying Ocean's End website
Defying Ocean's End book
Defying Ocean's End executive summary

2004 books
Marine biology
Biological oceanography
Marine conservation
Sustainable fishery
Island Press books